Barite rose may refer to:
 Rose rock
 Desert rose (crystal)

See also
 Barite, a mineral
 Rose (disambiguation)